Daniel Tai (born 1 June 1977) is a New Zealand professional boxer. He is a two time New Zealand National Boxing Federation (NZNBF) heavyweight title holder, and former ranked 12th in the World Boxing Organization (WBO) Asia Pacific rankings.

Tai currently holds the NZNBF heavyweight title belt.

Tai has challenged for the WBO Asia Pacific title twice in his career, both times against American-New Zealander Chauncy Welliver. Tai has fought a few notable boxers in his career, including Welliver three times, Sam Leuii twice, Danny Green, Sean Sullivan, Jameson Bostic and Bob Gasio.

Professional boxing titles
NZNBF: 
New Zealand National heavyweight title (220½ lbs) 2006
New Zealand National heavyweight title (235¼ lbs) 2018

Professional boxing record

References

1977 births
Living people
Boxers from Auckland
New Zealand male boxers
Heavyweight boxers
New Zealand professional boxing champions